The 2020 European Championship was a planned international rugby league tournament that would have taken place in October and November 2020. The teams were split into two pools of three, where the winners would have contested a final and the bottom teams would have been relegated to the 2022 European Championship B. The tournament was cancelled due to the COVID-19 pandemic.

Background
A restructured European Championship system was announced in January 2020, with the top tier to be contested by six teams across two pools. The draw was created by on 31 January 2020 at the Red Star Sport Society Media Centre in Belgrade by Stevan Stevanović and Jelena Stojiljković, the captains of Serbia's men's and women's rugby league teams, respectively.

The tournament was cancelled in July 2020 due to the COVID-19 pandemic. Postponement to 2021 was not possible due to the 2021 Rugby League World Cup – Men’s tournament. However, the World Cup was subsequently postponed to 2022 which will likely cause another schedule revision.

References 

European Nations Cup
2020 in French rugby league
2020 in Welsh rugby league
European rugby league competitions
Rugby League European Championship